The men's freestyle 57 kg is a competition featured at the 2016 Russian National Freestyle Wrestling Championships, and was held in Yakutsk, Russia on May 27.

Medalists

Incident between Lebedev and Musukaev
At the end of the quarterfinal wrestling match between Lebedev and Musukaev the referees awarded the victory to Viktor Lebedev. However, after the match the Russian Championships wrestling commission considered mistakes of the referee and awarded the victory to Ismail Musukaev (4-2). Even so, Lebedev remained in the semifinals.

Results
Legend
F — Won by fall
WO — Won by walkover

Finals

Top half

Section 1

Section 2

Bottom half

Section 3

Section 4

Repechage

References

http://wrestrus.ru/turnirs/215/table/57/1/
http://cs7003.vk.me/v7003798/205d7/RjxUatuE7SE.jpg
http://cs636318.vk.me/v636318357/a2b7/ncGW0eXT79o.jpg
http://cs636318.vk.me/v636318357/a2d1/1bWtF5c9cbo.jpg

Men's freestyle 57 kg